The 1975 Maine Black Bears football team was an American football team that represented the University of Maine as a member of the Yankee Conference during the 1975 NCAA Division II football season. In its ninth season under head coach Walter Abbott, the team compiled a 4–6 record (1–4 against conference opponents) and tied for last place in the Yankee Conference. Alfred Royer was the team captain.

Schedule

References

Maine
Maine Black Bears football seasons
Maine Black Bears football